Separability may refer to:

Mathematics 
 Separable algebra, a generalization to associative algebras of the notion of a separable field extension
 Separable differential equation, in which separation of variables is achieved by various means
 Separable extension, in field theory, an algebraic field extension
 Separable filter, a product of two or more simple filters in image processing
 Separable ordinary differential equation, a class of equations that can be separated into a pair of integrals
 Separable partial differential equation, a class of equations that can be broken down into differential equations in fewer independent variables
 Separable permutation, a permutation that can be obtained by direct sums and skew sums of the trivial permutation
 Separable polynomial, a polynomial whose number of distinct roots is equal to its degree
 Separable sigma algebra, a separable space in measure theory
 Separable space, a topological space that contains a countable, dense subset
 Linear separability, a geometric property of a pair of sets of points in Euclidean geometry
 Recursively inseparable sets, in computability theory, pairs of sets of natural numbers that cannot be "separated" with a recursive set

Other uses 
 Separable states, in quantum mechanics, states without quantum entanglement
 Separation process, in chemistry, a method that converts a mixture of substances into two or more distinct product mixtures